Torah Temimah may refer to:
 Torah Temimah Primary School
 Yeshiva Torah Temimah
 Torah Temimah, a commentary on the Pentateuch (Torah) written by Rabbi Baruch Epstein